Thomas Morton (c. 1579–1647) was an early colonist in North America from Devon, England. He was a lawyer, writer, and social reformer known for studying American Indian culture, and he founded the colony of Merrymount, located in Quincy, Massachusetts.

Biography

Early years
Thomas Morton was born in Devon in 1579, into a conservative Anglican family belonging to the landed gentry. Devon at that time was seen as the "dark corner of the land" by Protestant reformers, for its traditionalist intransigence, which included not only a High Church Anglicanism that shared many traits with Catholicism, but a paternalistic populism combined with rural folk tradition that to the Puritans seemed close to paganism. To locals, however, it was merely "Old England"a culture firmly ingrained in them.

In the late 1590s Morton studied law at London's Clifford's Inn, where he made influential contacts and lasting friendships. He was also exposed to a popular Renaissance Classicism and to the "libertine culture" of the Inns of Court, where bawdy revels included Gesta Grayorum performances associated with Francis Bacon and Shakespeare, It is likely that he there met Ben Jonson, who would remain a friend throughout his life. Though an ardent Royalist, Morton became a proponent of common Law against the emerging direct legal powers of the Crown and Star Chamber.

The early years of the 17th century saw Morton travelling between London and the Devonshire countryside as a legal champion of displaced countrymen "whose economic straits filled new tent-cities, furnished prisons and gallows, and pushed Devon men to the Bristol sea-trades". He eventually settled into the service of Ferdinando Gorges, governor of the English port of Plymouth and a major colonial entrepreneur. Gorges, an associate of Sir Walter Raleigh who had been part of Robert Devereux's Essex Conspiracy, was heavily involved in the "permissive" economy of the seas, and with many interests in New England would become the founder of the colony of Maine. Morton initially served him in a legal capacity in England, but after failed marriage plans in 1618 (due to the influence of a Puritan stepson) he decided to become one of Gorges's "landsmen" to oversee his interests in the colonies. Neither experience would enamour him of the Puritans.

Mount Wollaston
Morton took a three-month exploratory trip to America in 1622, but was back in England by early 1623 complaining of intolerance in certain elements of the Puritan community. He returned in 1624 as a senior partner in a Crown-sponsored trading venture, aboard the ship the Unity with his associate Captain Wollaston and 30 indentured young men. They settled and began trading for furs on a spit of land given by native Algonquian tribes, whose culture Morton is said to have seen as more "civilized and humanitarian" than that of his "intolerant European neighbours". "He revived forbidden old-world customs, faced off with a Puritan militia determined to quash his pagan festivals, and wound up in exile."

The Pilgrim separatists of the New England Plymouth Colony objected to sales of guns and liquor to the natives in exchange for furs and provisions, which at the time was technically illegal, although almost everyone was doing it. The weapons undoubtedly acquired by the Algonquians were used to defend themselves against raids from the northern Amerindian tribes, not against the fearful colonists. The trading post set up by the two men soon expanded into an agrarian colony that became known as Mount Wollaston – now Quincy, Massachusetts.

Morton fell out with Wollaston after discovering that Wollaston had been selling indentured servants into slavery on the Virginian tobacco plantations. Powerless to prevent Wollaston's slaving, Morton encouraged the remaining servants to rebel against Wollaston's harsh rule and organize themselves into a free community. Wollaston fled with his supporters to Virginia in 1626, leaving Morton in sole command of the colony, or its "host" as he preferred to be called, which was renamed Mount Ma-re (a play on "merry" and "the sea") or simply Merrymount. Under Morton's "hostship", an almost utopian project was begun, in which the colonists were declared free men or "consociates" and a degree of integration into local Algonquian culture was attempted. However, it was Morton's long-term plan to "further civilize" the native population by converting them to his liberal form of Christianity and providing them with free salt for food preservation, so enabling them to give up hunting and settle permanently. Morton referred to Book 3 of his New English Canaan memoirs as a manual on "how not to colonize" – referring to the Puritan practices.

Morton's religious beliefs were criticized by the Puritans of nearby Plymouth Colony as little more than a thinly disguised form of heathenism; they suspected him of "going native". Scandalous rumours spread of debauchery at Merrymount, which they claimed included immoral sexual liaisons with native women under what amounted to drunken orgies in honour of Bacchus and Aphrodite, or as the Puritan Governor William Bradford wrote in his history Of Plymouth Plantation,  Morton had taken traditional West Country May Day customs to the colony, and combined them with fashionable classical myth, couched to his own libertine tastes and fuelled by the enthusiasm of his newly freed fellow colonists. On a practical level the annual May Day festival was not only a reward for his hardworking colonists, but a joint celebration with Native tribes who also marked the day, and a chance for mostly male colonists to find brides among the natives.

Puritan ire was no doubt also fuelled by the fact that Merrymount was the fastest-growing colony in New England, rapidly becoming the most prosperous, as an agricultural producer and in the fur trade, where Plymouth Colony was trying to build a monopoly. The Puritan account of this regarded the colony as a decadent nest of good-for-nothings that annually attracted "all the scum of the country" to the area, or as Peter Lamborn Wilson puts it, "a Comus-crew of disaffected fur traders, antinomians, loose women, Indians and bon-vivants".

Banishment by the Puritans

Morton's group performed a second Mayday ritual in 1628 by erecting an  Maypole topped with deer antlers around which he and his followers caroused drunkenly. The Plymouth militia under Myles Standish took the town the following June with little resistance, chopped down the Maypole, and arrested Morton for supplying guns to the Indians. He was put in stocks in Plymouth, given a trial, and finally marooned on the deserted Isles of Shoals off the coast of New Hampshire until an English ship could take him home. The Merrymount community survived without Morton for another year, but was renamed Mount Dagon by the Puritans, after the sea god of the Philistines.

"New English Canaan"

In 1637, Morton published his three-volume New English Canaan, a denunciation of Puritan government in the colonies and their policy of building forts to guard themselves against Indian attack. He described the Indians as a far nobler culture and a new Canaan under attack from the "New Israel" of the Puritans.

Sedition trial and death
Morton returned to New England during the English Civil War where he was arrested for being a Royalist agitator. He was put on trial for his role in revoking the Plymouth Colony's charter and on charges of sedition. By September, he was imprisoned in Boston. His trial was delayed through winter but his health began to fail, so the Puritans granted him clemency. He ended his days among the planters of Maine, and he died in 1647 at age 71.

Legacy
The English government destroyed the first edition of New English Canaan in 1637, with a small number of copies surviving in the Netherlands. The Prince Society reprinted the original Amsterdam edition in 1883 with a foreword written by Charles Francis Adams Jr. Jack Dempsey produced an edited edition of Morton's book including a biography of Morton which was published in 1999.

Evaluation
In 1628, Plymouth Colony Governor William Bradford famously declared Morton a "Lord of Misrule.On October 12, 1812, John Adams wrote the following to Thomas Jefferson about Morton's book: 

Morton's The New English Canaan has been described as "an important work of early American environmental writing", as well as the first book banned in America.Joshua J. Mark. New English Canaan, World History Encyclopedia, 11 December 2020 Harrison T. Meserole describes Morton as "America's first rascal". Ed Simon argues that Morton "remains a powerful disruptive presence in the common founding myth of American identity."

In literature
Nathaniel Hawthorne's story "The May-Pole of Merry Mount" in his Twice-Told Tales (1837) and J. L. Motley's Merry Mount (1849) are based on Morton's colonial career.Merry Mount is a 1933 opera with libretto written by Richard Stokes and music by Howard Hanson. Based on Hawthorne's story, it premiered in Ann Arbor, Michigan, in 1933 and at the Metropolitan Opera in New York City in 1934. Seldom performed, it was revived in 2014. A suite compiled from the opera by Hanson is available in several recordings.

Morton appears as a member of the "jury of the damned" summoned by the Devil in Stephen Vincent Benet's short story, The Devil and Daniel Webster (1936).

Philip Roth references Morton and the colony of Merrymount in his novel The Dying Animal.

Morton is a central character in Robert Lowell's play "Endecott and the Red Cross", first published in a trilogy of one-act plays, The Old Glory (1965). Lowell cites Morton's book New Canaan'' and Hawthorn's story "The Maypole of Merry Mount" as two of his sources for the play.

"The Disturber"  by L. S. Davidson Jr., published by Macmillan Company in 1964, is a fictional account of Thomas Morton.

References

Further reading 
Morton, Thomas. New English Canaan, or, New Canaan: Containing an abstract of New England, composed in three bookes: the first booke setting forth the originall of the natives, their manners and customes, together with their tractable nature and love towards the English: the second booke setting forth the naturall indowments of the country, and what staple commodities it yealdeth: the third booke setting forth, what people are planted there, their prosperity, what remarkable accidents have happened since the first planting of it, together with their tenents and practise of their church. Printed at Amsterdam By Iacob Frederick Stam, 1637
Morton, Thomas, and Charles Francis Adams. The New English Canaan of Thomas Morton: With Introductory Matter and Notes. Boston: Prince Society, 1883. 
Morton, Thomas, and Jack Dempsey. New English Canaan: Text and Notes. Scituate, MA: Digital Scanning, 1999.

External links 

Morton's and Bradford's accounts of the Merrymount affair archive.org version of old aol.com site.
More Morton on Merrymount at swarthmore.edu.
Hawthorne's fictional version at Ned .edu.
Morton's account of Native Americans at fordham.edu.a

People of colonial Massachusetts
1647 deaths
1580s births
Lawyers from Devon
16th-century English people
17th-century English people
Kingdom of England emigrants to Massachusetts Bay Colony